Nathaniel Klay Naplah (born 5 December 1974 in Liberia) is a Liberian football coach and former footballer.

Early life

Due to the recrudescence of civil war in Liberia in the 1990s, Naplah eventually moved to Ghana, his father's homeland.

Career

Agreeing a free contract with German lower-league side 1. SC Norderstedt in September 1999, Naplah previously played for Tampines Rovers and Balestier Central in Singapore, leaving the former in June 1999. Besides playing his trade in Singapore and Germany, he has also played abroad in Malaysia, for Negeri Sembilan FA. Taking up a youth coaching position at the International Soccer Academy in Singapore, the former Liberian international has led some of their teams to the Gothia Cup, a global tournament for youth sides.

He has called on the Singapore national team to play friendlies against better opposition.

References

External links 
 at National-Football-Teams

1974 births
Living people
Liberian footballers
Liberian football managers
Association football defenders
Liberian expatriate footballers
Liberian expatriate sportspeople in Germany
Expatriate footballers in Germany
FC Eintracht Norderstedt 03 players
Liberia international footballers